Paul Deslandes, full name Nicolas Théodore Paulin Deslandes, (1806 – 25 April 1866) was a 19th-century French playwright.

A singer at the Opéra Comique where he made his debut 3 April 1832, his plays were presented on the most important Parisian stages of the 19th century: Théâtre du Vaudeville, Théâtre du Palais-Royal, Théâtre de l'Ambigu etc.

He is buried at the Père Lachaise Cemetery. The bronze bust of E. Levêque adorning his tomb was beheaded by vandals.

Works 

1833: Étienne et Robert, drame populaire in 1 act, mingled with couplets, with Charles Didier
1833: La Modiste et le lord, comédie-anecdote mingled with song, in 2 acts, with Didier
1834: L'École des ivrognes, tableau populaire mingled with couplets, with Didier
1835: Le Lycéen, comédie en vaudeville in 1 act, with Didier
1835: Le Vendu, tableau populaire, in 1 act, mingled with couplets, with Didier
1836: L'Enfant du faubourg, drame populaire in 3 acts, mingled with couplets, with Didier
1836: L'art de ne pas payer son terme, ou Avis aux propriétaires, vaudeville in 1 act, with Didier
1836 Théodore, ou Heureux quand même, vaudeville in 1 act, with Jean-François-Alfred Bayard
1836: Un véritable amour, drama in 3 acts, mingled with song, with Didier
1837: L'Ange gardien, comedy in 3 acts, mingled with song, with Dupeuty
1837: Les Deux mères, vaudeville in 2 acts, with Eugène Cormon and Didier
1837: Haïdée la pestiférée, ou Femme, mère et maîtresse, drama in 3 acts
1837: Portier, je veux de tes cheveux !, historical anecdote in 1 act, with Théodore Cogniard and Didier
1838: A bas les hommes !, vaudeville in 2 acts, with Cogniard brothers and Ernest Jaime
1839: Dagobert, ou la Culotte à l'envers, drame historique et drôlatique, in 3 acts and in verses, preceded by a prologue speech in verses, by Jules-Henri Vernoy de Saint-Georges, Adolphe de Leuven and Deslandes, with de Leuven and de Saint-Georges
1839: Les Travestissemens, opéra comique in 1 act
1842: Tabarin, comedy in 3 acts mingled with couplets, with Dumanoir
1843: Les Canuts, comedy in 2 acts, mingled with couplets, with Antoine-François Varner
1843: Le Noctambule, comédie-vaudeville in 1 act, with Varner
1848: Le Buveur d'eau, tableau populaire in 1 act, with Charles Dupeuty
1848: Les Deux anges gardiens, comédie-vaudeville in 1 act
1848: Un et un font un, vaudeville in 1 act, with Adrien Decourcelle
1848: Mignonne, comédie-vaudeville in 1 act
1849: L'Impertinent, comédie-vaudeville in 2 acts, with Jean-François-Alfred Bayard
1850: Castagnette, vaudeville in 1 act
1850: La Gamine, vaudeville in 1 act
1851: Les Deux prudhommes, comédie-vaudeville in 1 act
1851: Jeanne, comédie-vaudeville in 3 acts, with Auguste Anicet-Bourgeois and Raymond Deslandes
1852: La Poissarde, ou les Halles en 1804, drama in 5 acts, with Ernest Bourget and Dupeuty
1853: Où peut-on être mieux ?, vaudeville in 1 act, with Charles Potier
1853: La Peine du talion, vaudeville in 1 act
1854: Bertrand, c'est Raton, vaudeville in 1 act
1854: Une idée de jeune fille, vaudeville in 1 act
1855: Le Jeu du cœur, vaudeville in 3 acts
1856: Un enfant du siècle, play in 3 acts, with Joachim Duflot
1857: Le Conscrit de Mont-rouge, drama in 5 acts, including 1 prologue
1857: Isambart marié, vaudeville in 3 acts
1858: La Noce de Tronquette, tableau populaire in 1 act
1858: Vingt ans ou la Vie d'un séducteur, drame-vaudeville en 5 acts, with Potier, 1858
1859: Les chevaliers du pince-nez, comédie vaudeville in 2 acts, with Eugène Grangé and Lambert-Thiboust, 1859
1860: Colombe et pinson, vaudeville in 1 act
1861: Grain-de-sable, vaudeville in 2 acts
1863: La Dernière grisette, vaudeville in 3 acts
1863: Pataud, vaudeville in 1 act
1867: Le Père Gachette, drama in 5 acts, in 8 tableaux
undated: Album lyrique composé de romances, rondes et chansonnettes

Bibliography 
 Pierre Larousse, Nouveau Larousse illustré: dictionnaire universel, 1898, (p. 660)
 Jean-Louis Tamvaco, Ivor Forbes Guest, Les cancans de l'Opéra, 2000, (p. 610)

References

External links 
 Paulin Deslandes on Data.bnf.fr

19th-century French dramatists and playwrights
19th-century French singers
Writers from Paris
1806 births
1866 deaths
Burials at Père Lachaise Cemetery